South Ribble is a constituency represented in the House of Commons of the UK Parliament since 2019 by Katherine Fletcher, a Conservative.

History
The seat of South Ribble was created for the 1983 general election, following the local government changes in the 1970s which saw the creation of the main constitutive borough of the same name.

Former Preston North MP Robert Atkins won the South Ribble constituency in 1983 and fought the seat in every election up to the 1997 general election. At that time, in dramatic bellwether fashion, Labour's David Borrow gained the seat on a clear majority, with nearly 26,000 votes, 2,000 less than Robert Atkins' victory in 1983 which was the equally unusual landslide result. From the 1997 "landslide year" until 2010, David Borrow's vote total and majority consistently shrunk with a swing back to the Conservatives at every election. In terms of the other parties, Liberal Democrats have not thus far achieved better than third and 2005 saw UKIP nominating a candidate for the first time, and taking just over 1,200 votes. Borrow finally lost South Ribble in 2010 on a large two-party swing to Conservative Lorraine Fullbrook.

Boundaries

1983–1997: The Borough of South Ribble.

1997–2010: The Borough of South Ribble wards of Charnock, Farington, Howick, Hutton and New Longton, Kingsfold, Leyland Central, Leyland St Ambrose, Leyland St John's, Leyland St Mary's, Little Hoole and Much Hoole, Longton Central and West, Lostock Hall, Manor, Middleforth Green, Moss Side, Priory, and Seven Stars, and the District of West Lancashire wards of Hesketh with Becconsall, North Meols, Rufford, and Tarleton.

2010–present: The Borough of South Ribble wards of Broad Oak, Charnock, Earnshaw Bridge, Golden Hill, Howick and Priory, Kingsfold, Leyland Central, Leyland St Ambrose, Leyland St Mary's, Little Hoole and Much Hoole, Longton and Hutton West, Lowerhouse, Middleforth, Moss Side, New Longton and Hutton East, Seven Stars, and Whitefield, the District of West Lancashire wards of Hesketh with Becconsall, North Meols, Rufford, and Tarleton, and the Borough of Chorley wards of Eccleston and Mawdesley, and Lostock.

The seat's original boundaries were coterminous with the South Ribble borough. Due to its population figures, the borough of South Ribble and its parliamentary constituency have not shared the same boundaries since, although the towns of Leyland and Penwortham have always featured at the centre of the constituency.

For the 1997 general election, the eastern villages of Bamber Bridge and Walton-le-Dale were moved to the Preston constituency. Following the review of parliamentary representation in Lancashire prior to the 2010 general election, Walton-le-Dale and Bamber Bridge were subsequently transferred into the Ribble Valley seat, along with the villages of Samlesbury, Higher Walton, Coupe Green, Gregson Lane, Lostock Hall, Farington and Farington Moss. This means the borough of South Ribble is now split between the South Ribble and Ribble Valley parliamentary seats.

Members of Parliament

Elections

Elections in the 2010s

Elections in the 2000s

Elections in the 1990s

Elections in the 1980s

See also
List of parliamentary constituencies in Lancashire

Notes

References

Parliamentary constituencies in North West England
Constituencies of the Parliament of the United Kingdom established in 1983
Politics of South Ribble
Politics of the Borough of West Lancashire